Luka Vončina (born December 27, 1991, in Ljubljana, Slovenia) is a Slovenian professional basketball player for Ilirija of the Slovenian League. He is a 1.91 m tall Shooting guard.

References

External links
 Eurobasket.com profile

1991 births
Living people
Basketball players from Ljubljana
Slovenian men's basketball players
Point guards
Shooting guards
Charlotte 49ers men's basketball players
KK Olimpija players
KD Ilirija players
Slovenian expatriate basketball people in the United States